Ben O'Connor may refer to:

 Ben O'Connor (hurler) (born 1979), Irish hurling coach and former player
 Ben O'Connor (ice hockey) (born 1988), British ice hockey player
 Ben O'Connor (cyclist) (born 1995), Australian road cyclist

See also
 Ben Connor (born 1992), British runner
 Benjamin Connor (1813-1876), British railway engineer